Blakemore may refer to:

 Blakemore (surname), with a list of people by this name 
 Blakemore, Arkansas, United States
 A. F. Blakemore, British food retail, wholesale and distribution company usually known as Blakemore
 G. Blakemore Evans (1912–2005), American scholar of Elizabethan literature
 Sengstaken–Blakemore tube, used in the management of upper gastrointestinal hemorrhage
 Steuart Blakemore Building, museum and historical archive, part of the Mary Ball Washington Museum and Library in Lancaster, Virginia

See also  
 Blackmore (disambiguation)
 Blackamoors (disambiguation)